Melina Dawn Hamilton (born 15 June 1976 in Rotorua) is a retired New Zealand athlete who specialised in the pole vault. She represented her country at the 2004 Summer Olympics, as well as two World Championships, without reaching the final.

Her personal bests of 4.40 metres outdoors (2003) and 4.20 metres indoors (2004) were at the time national records; both were broken in 2014 by Eliza McCartney.

Competition record

References

1976 births
Living people
Sportspeople from Rotorua
New Zealand female pole vaulters
Olympic athletes of New Zealand
Athletes (track and field) at the 2004 Summer Olympics
Athletes (track and field) at the 1998 Commonwealth Games
Athletes (track and field) at the 2002 Commonwealth Games
Athletes (track and field) at the 2006 Commonwealth Games
World Athletics Championships athletes for New Zealand
Commonwealth Games competitors for New Zealand
20th-century New Zealand women
21st-century New Zealand women